In Mexican linguistics, saltillo (Spanish, meaning "little skip") is the word for a glottal stop consonant. The name was given by the early grammarians of Classical Nahuatl. The saltillo, in both capital and small letter versions, appears in Unicode (in the Latin Extended-D block), but is often written with an apostrophe; it is sometimes written  (for either pronunciation), or  when pronounced . The spelling of the glottal stop with an apostrophe-like character most likely originates from transliterations of the Arabic hamza. It has also been written with a grave accent over the preceding vowel in some Nahuatl works, following Horacio Carochi (1645).

A glottal stop exists as a phoneme in many other indigenous languages of the Americas and its presence or absence can distinguish words. However, there is no glottal stop in Standard Spanish, so the sound is often imperceptible to Spanish speakers, and Spanish writers usually did not write it when transcribing Mexican languages: Nahuatl  "in a fire" and  "he ascends" were both typically written , for example.

The saltillo letter

Although in Spanish the basic meaning of the word 'saltillo' is the sound, it is often applied to the letter used to write that sound, especially the straight apostrophe, and this is the usual meaning in English. The alphabet of the Tlapanec language (Me̱ꞌpha̱a̱) uses both uppercase and lowercase saltillos, . Other languages, such as Rapa Nui, use only a lowercase saltillo, with the first vowel capitalized when a word begins with a glottal stop.

Both are typically rendered with a straight apostrophe-like shape sometimes described as a dotless exclamation point. Typesetters who are unfamiliar with Unicode frequently use an apostrophe instead, but that can cause problems in electronic files because the apostrophe is a punctuation mark, not a word-building character, and the ambiguous use of apostrophe for two different functions can make automated processing of the text difficult.

The lowercase saltillo letter is used in Miꞌkmaq of Canada, Izere of Nigeria and in at least one Southeast Asian language, Central Sinama of the Philippines and Malaysia. In the latter it represents both the glottal stop and the centralized vowel  and derives from the historical use of hamza for those sounds in Arabic script. Examples are bowaꞌ 'mouth' as a consonant and nsꞌllan 'oil' as a vowel.

See also
Glottal stop (letter)
Hamza
ʻOkina

References

External links
 Definition of saltillo

Glottal consonants
Languages of Mexico
Latin-script letters
Plosives